Portrait of a Young Man is an oil painting on panel by Giovanni Bellini in the Walker Art Gallery in Liverpool, to which it was donated in 1948 by the Liverpool Royal Institution.

References

Young Man
Paintings in the collection of the Walker Art Gallery